The men's discus throw at the 2010 World Junior Championships in Athletics was held at the Moncton 2010 Stadium on 23 & 24 July.  A 1.75 kg (junior implement) discus was used.

Medalists

Records
Prior to the competition, the existing world junior and championship records were as follows.

Results

Final
24 July

Qualifications
23 July

Qualification standard 59.40m or at least best 12 qualified.

Group A

Group B

Participation
According to an unofficial count, 35 athletes from 28 countries participated in the event.

References

1Discus throw
Discus throw at the World Athletics U20 Championships